Sklodowskite is a uranium mineral with the chemical formula: Mg(UO2)2(HSiO4)2·5H2O. It is a secondary mineral which contains magnesium and is a bright yellow colour, its crystal habit is acicular, but can form in other shapes. It has a Mohs hardness of about 2–3.
It is named after the maiden name of Marie Skłodowska Curie. It is the magnesium analogue of the much more common uranium mineral Cuprosklodowskite, which contains copper instead.

References

A. Schoep, La sklodowskite, nouveau mineral radioactif, C. R. Acad. Sci. Paris, 179, 143 (1924)

Uranium(VI) minerals
Monoclinic minerals
Minerals in space group 12